Beat the Bastards is the seventh album by Scottish punk rock band The Exploited, released in 1996 through Rough Justice Records. The song "They Lie" was covered on End of Disclosure by Hypocrisy.

Track listing

Personnel

The Exploited
Wattie Buchan – vocals
Fraser Rosetti – guitar
Jim Gray – bass
Willie Buchan – drums

Additional personnel
Jim Spencer and ZM – engineering
Colin Richardson – mixing
Frank Arkwright – digital editing

References

1996 albums
The Exploited albums
Albums produced by Colin Richardson